Ignacy Wyssogota Zakrzewski (1745–1802) was a notable Polish nobleman, politician, art collector, Freemason, and the Mayor of Warsaw during the last years of the Polish–Lithuanian Commonwealth, in 1792 and 1794.

Biography

Ignacy Wyssogota Zakrzewski was born in Stary Białcz (Greater Poland Voivodeship). He was deputy of Poznań for the Great Sejm and one of the co-authors of the reforms of treasury passed by the Sejm during the Constitution of 3 May. In 1791 he co-founded the Society of Friends of the Constitution, and was among the most notable supporters of the reforms passed by that act, along with Hugo Kołłątaj and Ignacy Potocki. In 1792 he became the Mayor of Warsaw, but was overthrown by the confederation of Targowica. After the outbreak of the Kościuszko's Insurrection and the Warsaw Uprising of 1794 he again held that post. Simultaneously, he held a number of important government posts during the war with Russia, among them he headed the Provisional Temporary Council and the Supreme National Council. After that part of Poland, along with Warsaw, was finally annexed in the effect of the Third Partition, he was arrested by the Russians and imprisoned in St. Petersburg. Released from prison in 1796, he returned to Poland and spent the remainder of his life in a small manor in Żelechów. He died on 15 February 1802.

Remembrance
Ignacy Wyssogota Zakrzewski is one of the characters immortalized in Jan Matejko's 1891 painting, Constitution of 3 May 1791.

References

Sources

1745 births
1802 deaths
People from Międzychód County
18th-century Polish nobility
Mayors of Warsaw
Kościuszko insurgents
Members of the Great Sejm
Recipients of the Order of the White Eagle (Poland)